The 1914 Louisville Cardinals football team was an American football team that represented the University of Louisville as an independent during the 1914 college football season. In their first and only season under head coach Bruce Baker, the Cardinals compiled a 1–4 record. The team played its home games at Eclipse Park in Louisville, Kentucky.

Schedule

References

Louisville
Louisville Cardinals football seasons
Louisville Cardinals football